The 47th Golden Bell Awards (Mandarin:第47屆金鐘獎) was held on October 26, 2012 at Sun Yat-sen Memorial Hall in Taipei, Taiwan. The ceremony was broadcast live by CTS.

Winners and nominees
Below is the list of winners and nominees for the main categories.

References

External links
 Official website of the 47th Golden Bell Awards

2012
2012 television awards
2012 in Taiwan